Silueta (English Silhouette) is the 8th studio album by Mexican pop singer Ana Gabriel. It was released in 1992. This material was produced by herself and Max Pierre.

Track listing

Tracks:
 Tú Y Yo
 Todavía Tenemos Tiempo
 Amándole
 Llena de Romance
 Mal Contigo, Peor Sin Ti
 Que Bien Me Siento
 Silueta
 Todo Terminó
 Hay Que Hablar
 Quiero Yo Saber
 Evidencias
 Te Amo

Singles
 Silueta
 Hay Que Hablar
 Todavía Tenemos Tiempo
 Tú y yo
 Evidencias (1993)

Singles charts

 Note: "Evidencias" (Evidences) was a huge success reaching #1 in the Billboard Hot Latin Songs, it remained there for 10 weeks from August 8, 1992 to October 10, 1992, it stayed for 19 weeks in the chart. This was her 6th #1.

Album chart
This release reached the #1 position in Billboard Top Latin Albums, this is her fourth album of Ana Gabriel to top the chart and stayed for 43 weeks.

See also
List of number-one Billboard Latin Pop Albums from the 1990s

References

1992 albums
Ana Gabriel albums